Ramón Colón-López (born October 21, 1971) is a senior non-commissioned officer of the United States Air Force and a former pararescueman, and was selected as the 4th Senior Enlisted Advisor to the Chairman (SEAC) on December 13, 2019. In his role as SEAC, Colón-López is the most senior enlisted member of the United States military.  In 2007 he was the only Hispanic American among the first six airmen to be awarded the newly created Air Force Combat Action Medal. He served as the Senior Enlisted Leader of United States Africa Command from September 2016 to November 2019.

Early life and family
Colón-López was born to Vilma López and Ramon Colon-Torres in the city of Ponce, Puerto Rico, located in the southern coast of the island. His family moved to Bridgeport, Connecticut and in 1989, he graduated from Kolbe Cathedral High School. Colón-López wanted to pursue a degree in the field of biology and attended Sacred Heart University. However, after two semesters, on 10 December 1990, he enlisted in the United States Air Force and trained as a Transportation Specialist.

Military career
After graduating basic military training as a Transportation Specialist at Lackland Air Force Base, Texas, Colón-López was stationed at Iraklion Air Station in Crete. He was deployed during the Gulf War. In 1994, he volunteered for Pararescue duty training and completed his training in 1996 with 12 of his original 113 PJ candidates. After completing the PJ "pipeline" he was assigned to the 48th Rescue Squadron out of Holloman Air Force Base, New Mexico. While a member of the 48th RQS he participated in various assignments, among which were Operation Southern Watch and Operation Northern Watch as Combat Search and Rescue Team Leader. He left the 48th RQS in January 1999 to join the 24th Special Tactics Squadron, located at Pope Air Force Base, North Carolina.

24th Special Tactics Squadron

From 1999 to 2005 Colón-López was a member of the 24th Special Tactics Squadron as a Special Tactics Element Leader. While a member of the 24th STS, from July 2002 to September 2004, Colón-López was deployed four times to Afghanistan as part of a joint task force to several classified locations in support of Operation Enduring Freedom. While deployed he participated in a series of joint operations, including direct assaults and combat search and rescue missions. During this time he also protected future Afghanistan president, Hamid Karzai, and received his first Bronze Star Medal with valor for his actions under fire while supporting Karzai's security detail. His second Bronze Star Medal was for his actions after his helicopter was shot down during a mission in Afghanistan. After the helicopter crash landed, two Navy SEALs and Colón-López assaulted fortified enemy positions, killing five combatants and ensuring the safety of the remaining crew. He was selected to create and implement the unit's compartmented Personnel Recovery Advance Force Operations team, which serviced the entire Joint Special Operations arena.

On March 11, 2004, Colón-López, together with his Advance Force Operations Team and elements of the Afghan National Strike Unit, participated in an operation which required the capture of a high level target and a follow-on site exploitation with the intention of preventing the proliferation of chemical weapons. His helicopter drew hostile enemy fire yet Colón-López continued on his mission, which resulted in two enemy kills, the capture of 10 enemy troops and the destruction of multiple rocket propelled grenades and small caliber weapons. In January 2005, after Colón-López returned to the United States, he was named Superintendent of Training and later as interim Commandant of the Pararescue and Combat Rescue Officer School.

Later career

On June 13, 2007, Colón-López became the first Hispanic, and one of the first six airmen, to be awarded the newly created Air Force Combat Action Medal. It was bestowed upon him by Air Force Chief of Staff General T. Michael Moseley at the Air Force Memorial, in Washington, D.C. The medal was created to recognize Air Force members who are engaged in air or ground combat "outside the wire" in combat zones. Airmen who are under direct and hostile fire, or who personally engaged hostile forces with direct and lethal fire are eligible to receive the award. The other five airmen to receive the award were Major Steve Raspet; Master Sergeant Byron P. Allen; Master Sergeant Charlie Peterson; Staff Sergeant Daniel Paxton; and Captain Allison K. Black.

After leaving the PJ/CRO Schoolhouse Colón-López returned to Pope Field and the 24th Special Tactics Squadron as the unit's Senior Enlisted Advisor from April 2009 to April 2011. As of 2009 a mannequin of Colón-López is featured at the United States Air Force Museum located in Dayton, Ohio, in the museum's "Warrior Airmen" exhibit.

After serving as the SEA for the 24th STS for two years, Colón-López then served as the inaugural Group Superintendent of the 724th Special Tactics Group at Pope Field, which was activated on 30 April 2011. However, he only held the position for six months before becoming the Command Chief Master Sergeant of the 1st Special Operations Wing at Hurlburt Field on November 30, 2011. In January 2013 Colón-López was reassigned to the 18th Wing at Kadena AB, Japan where he served as the wing's Command Chief. In addition to his traditional duties as a wing's Command Chief he also served as Kadena Air Base's senior enlisted liaison between the 18th Wing and enlisted personnel from other Department of Defense branches on Okinawa.

In 2013 the Air Force Professional Development Guide (PDG) featured an excerpt regarding Colón-López added in the "Enlisted Heritage" chapter, in which it refers to his actions in Afghanistan that led to his receiving the Air Force Combat Action Medal. The PDG is studied by airmen for the Promotion Fitness Examination portion of the Weighted Airman Promotion System which overall determines promotions to the ranks of Staff Sergeant (E-5) through Technical Sergeant (E-6) Air Force-wide.

In June 2014, Colon-Lopez was selected to replace Chief Master Sergeant Shelina Frey as the command chief for United States Air Forces Central Command.

In May 2022, Colon-Lopez received an honorary rank of master chief by the Master Chief Petty Officer of the Coast Guard, MCPOCG Heath B. Jones.

Education
1991 USAF Traffic Management School, Sheppard AFB, TX
1994 USAF Pararescue Selection Course (OL-H), Lackland AFB, TX
1995 Special Forces Underwater Operations (SFUWO) Combat Diver Course, NAS Key West, FL
1996 Pararescue Apprentice Course, Kirtland AFB, NM
1997 Airman Leadership School, Holloman AFB, NM
2000 SFUWO Dive Medical Technician Course, NAS Key West, FL
2001 Airborne Jumpmaster Course, Little Creek NAS, VA
2003 Military Freefall Jumpmaster Course, Yuma PG, AZ
2003 Noncommissioned Officer Academy, Maxwell-Gunter AFB, AL
2005 Basic Instructor Course, Lackland AFB, TX
2005 Associate degree in Survival and Rescue Operations, Community College of the Air Force
2005 USAF Senior Noncommissioned Officer Academy (correspondence)
2007 USAF Senior Noncommissioned Officer Academy, Maxwell-Gunter AFB, AL
2009 Chief Leadership Course, Maxwell-Gunter AFB, AL
2011 Senior Enlisted Joint PME (correspondence)
2011 Keystone – National Defense University, Ft. McNair, Washington DC
2012 Gettysburg Leadership Experience, Gettysburg, PA
2012 USAF Leadership Enhancement Program, Center for Creative Leadership, Greensboro NC
2012 Latin America: A Political-Economic Conflict Seminar, Washington DC
2015 Enterprise Leadership Seminar, University of North Carolina, Chapel Hill, N.C.
2017 National and International Security Leadership Seminar, Washington D.C.
2017 Associate degree in Management Studies, University of Maryland, Md
2017 Bachelor of Science degree in Management Studies (cum laude), University of Maryland, Md..
2017 Professional Manager's Certification, University of Maryland, Md.
2019 Executive Education Program (Meta-Leadership), Harvard University, Cambridge MA

Assignments
 April 1991 – October 1992, Traffic Management Specialist, 7276th Air Base Group, Iraklion Air Station, Crete, Greece
 October 1992 – September 1994, Traffic Management Journeyman, 12th Transportation Squadron, Randolph Air Force Base, Texas
 September 1994 – October 1996, Pararescue student, Det 1 342nd Training Squadron, Kirtland Air Force Base, New Mexico
 October 1996 – February 1999, Pararescue Journeyman, 48th Rescue Squadron, Holloman Air Force Base, New Mexico
 February 1999 – January 2005, Special Tactics Element Leader, 24th Special Tactics Squadron, Pope Air Force Base, North Carolina
 January 2005 – November 2006, Superintendent of Training/Chief Enlisted Manager, USAF PJ/CRO School, Kirtland Air Force Base, New Mexico
 November 2006 – April 2009, Commandant, USAF PJ/CRO School, Kirtland Air Force Base, New Mexico
 April 2009 – April 2011, Senior Enlisted Adviser, 24th Special Tactics Squadron, Pope Air Force Base, North Carolina
 April 2011 – November 2011, Group Superintendent, 724th Special Tactics Group, Pope Field, North Carolina
 November 2011 – January 2013, Command Chief, 1st Special Operations Wing, Hurlburt Field, Florida
 January 2013 – June 2014, Command Chief, 18th Wing, Kadena Air Base, Okinawa, Japan
 June 2014 – June 2016, Command Chief, United States Air Forces Central Command, Southwest Asia
 June 2016 – September 2016, Senior Enlisted Advisor, Assistant Secretary of the Air Force, Manpower and Reserve Affairs, Headquarters United States Air Force, Pentagon, Washington, D.C.
 September 2016 – November 2019, Senior Enlisted Leader, United States Africa Command, Kelley Barracks, Stuttgart, Germany
 December 2019 – present, Senior Enlisted Advisor to the Chairman of the Joint Chiefs of Staff, The Pentagon, Washington, DC

Awards, decorations and honors
Colón-López' military decorations and badges are the following:

Other awards
 1994 Senior Airman below the zone
 1997 Leadership Award, Airman Leadership School
 1998 Air Combat Command (ACC) Pararescue Noncommissioned Officer of the Year
 2003 Commandant's Award and Distinguished Graduate, Gunter NCO Academy
 2004 Air Force Pararescue Senior Noncommissioned Officer of the Year
 2005 Air Force Lance P. Sijan Leadership Award recipient, Senior Noncommissioned Officer
 2005 Team Kirtland Senior Noncommissioned Officer of the Year
 2006 Jaycee's Ten Outstanding Young Americans USAF nominee to U.S. Chamber of Commerce
 2013 Gathering of Eagles Inductee, USAF Air Command and Staff College
 2017 Induction, Distinguished Veteran's Hall of Fame, Puerto Rico.
 2020 NDIA DeProspero Lifetime Achievement Award

See also

List of Puerto Ricans
List of Puerto Rican military personnel
Hispanics in the United States Air Force

Notes

References

Further reading
Puertorriquenos Who Served With Guts, Glory, and Honor. Fighting to Defend a Nation Not Completely Their Own; by : Greg Boudonck; 
Never Quit: From Alaskan Wilderness Rescues to Afghanistan Firefights as an Elite Special Ops PJ; by : Jimmy Settle;

External links

Official Defense Department Biography

1971 births
Puerto Rican United States Air Force personnel
Military personnel from Bridgeport, Connecticut
Sacred Heart University alumni
Military personnel from Ponce
Recipients of the Air Medal
Living people
Recipients of the Defense Superior Service Medal
Recipients of the Meritorious Service Medal (United States)
United States Air Force airmen